Barbonymus collingwoodii is a species of ray-finned fish in the genus Barbonymus which is found in fast flowing, cold upland streams in Borneo where it is endemic.

locally known as Kepiat and Kepek

Description 
Distinguishable from other members of the genus in having a compressed and slightly elongated body with an elevated back, colored silvery or golden yellow. It has a small head with a short, pointed snout and a terminal mouth, a clear to slight red dorsal fin with a black blotch at the tip, orange to red pelvic fins, clear pectoral and anal fins, yellow to orange caudal fin with a black submarginal stripe along each lobe, and 8 scale rows between dorsal-fin origin and lateral line.

It grows up to 6 inches (15 cm) in length.

Habitat 
It is a riverine species that inhabits fast flowing forest streams and clear water pools with a rocky, sandy, or gravel base.

Footnotes 

 

collingwoodii
Fish described in 1868
Taxa named by Albert Günther